Dagfinn Ripnes (born 12 January 1939) is a Norwegian politician for the Conservative Party.

He served as a deputy representative to the Norwegian Parliament from Møre og Romsdal during the term 1997–2001.

On the local level he was mayor of Kristiansund municipality from 1997 to 2007.

References

1939 births
Living people
Deputy members of the Storting
Conservative Party (Norway) politicians
Mayors of places in Møre og Romsdal
Politicians from Kristiansund
Place of birth missing (living people)